David Gillette is an American paleontologist best known for his discovery of the dinosaur Diplodocus hallorum in 1985, and more recently for his work studying Pleistocene megafauna such as glyptodonts. At the time of its discovery, Diplodocus hallorum was the longest dinosaur known.

Discoveries

Gillette found eight huge bones of the Diplodocus in northwestern New Mexico in May 1985. Gillette began comparing the dinosaur bones he found to those of other dinosaurs. Gillette presented his conclusions in a press conference at the New Mexico Museum of Natural History and Science and in the Journal of Vertebrate Paleontology He gave the new dinosaur the name Seismosaurus halli, or "earth shaker." In 1993, Gillette published his book, Seismosaurus: The Earth Shaker, about his discovery. It was published by Columbia University Press and illustrated by Mark Hallett. The book was re-printed in paperback in 1999.

Seismosaurus was later re-categorized as a new species of Diplodocus, and renamed Diplodocus hallorum: while the specimen Gillette described was indeed of a novel species, it belonged to the existing Diplodocus genus rather than a previously undiscovered group.

References

American paleontologists
Living people
Year of birth missing (living people)